Chen Jian-yu is a Taiwanese politician. He served as the Minister of Transportation and Communications from 9 January 2015 until 20 May 2016.

Education
Chen obtained his bachelor's degree in law from Soochow University in 1979.

Minister of Transportation and Communication
On 9 January 2015, Chen was appointed the acting Minister of Transportation and Communication after the resignation of former Minister Yeh Kuang-shih after his financial restructuring plan for Taiwan High Speed Rail Corporation was rejected earlier on. He was officially appointed to the ministerial position on 23 January.

References

Living people
Soochow University (Taiwan) alumni
Taiwanese Ministers of Transportation and Communications
Year of birth missing (living people)